1617 Alschmitt, provisional designation , is an assumed carbonaceous asteroid from in the outer parts of the main belt, approximately 30 kilometers in diameter. It was discovered on 20 March 1952, by French astronomer Louis Boyer at Algiers Observatory in Algeria, Northern Africa, and named after French astronomer Alfred Schmitt.

Orbit and classification 

This asteroid orbits the Sun in the outer main-belt at a distance of 2.8–3.6 AU once every 5 years and 9 months (2,091 days). Its orbit has an eccentricity of 0.13 and an inclination of 13° with respect to the ecliptic.

Physical characteristics 

Alschmitt is a presumed carbonaceous C-type asteroid.

Lightcurves 

Two rotational lightcurve of Alschmitt obtained in 2003 and 2004, by René Roy and Laurent Bernasconi, gave a well-defined rotation period of 7.0613 and 7.062 hours with a brightness variation of 0.39 and 0.52 in magnitude, respectively. In October 2010, the Palomar Transient Factory derived a period of 7.0602 hours with an amplitude 0.49 magnitude.

Diameter and albedo 

According to the survey carried out by NASA's Wide-field Infrared Survey Explorer with its subsequent NEOWISE mission, Alschmitt measures 21.12 and 21.28 kilometers in diameter, and its surface has an albedo of 0.190 and 0.270, respectively. The Collaborative Asteroid Lightcurve Link assumes a standard albedo for carbonaceous asteroids of 0.057 and calculates a diameter of 36.78 kilometers using an absolute magnitude of 10.9.

Naming 

Boyer named this minor planet for his colleague Alfred Schmitt (1907–1973), astronomer at Algiers, Strasbourg and Quito observatories, who, 20 years earlier, had named the asteroid 1215 Boyer in his honor. The official  was published by the Minor Planet Center on 1 August 1978.

References

External links 
 Asteroid Lightcurve Database (LCDB), query form (info )
 Dictionary of Minor Planet Names, Google books
 Asteroids and comets rotation curves, CdR – Observatoire de Genève, Raoul Behrend
 Discovery Circumstances: Numbered Minor Planets (1)-(5000)  – Minor Planet Center
 
 

001617
Discoveries by Louis Boyer (astronomer)
Named minor planets
19520320